Dan-Air Flight 1903 was an unscheduled international passenger service from Manchester to Barcelona, operated by Dan Air Services Limited under contract with British tour operator Clarksons Holidays, which arranged for the flight to carry a group of holidaymakers who had booked an all-inclusive package holiday with the operator.  

On 3 July 1970, the de Havilland Comet 4 aircraft serving the flight crashed into the wooded slopes of the Serralada del Montseny near Arbúcies, in the Province of Girona of Catalonia, Spain.  The crash resulted in the aircraft's destruction and the deaths of all 112 on board.  It was the deadliest aviation accident in 1970, and remains the deadliest aviation accident involving the De Havilland Comet.

The crash was Dan-Air's first fatal accident killing fare-paying passengers. News of the first major accident, in the company's eighteenth year of existence, came just two days after British tour operator Global Holidays had awarded it a four-year, £2.5-million contract for all Global charter flights from Birmingham, starting in April 1971.

Accident
Flight 1903, which had departed Manchester Airport at 16:08 local time, encountered air traffic control (ATC) delays in the Paris area, resulting in a change of route. Six minutes later, the flight was handed over to Barcelona ATC (approach control), and acknowledged that Runway 25 was in use at Barcelona Airport.

While carrying out the left turn as instructed, the crew reported in error that they had passed the Sabadell NDB. As, according to ATC, another aircraft overflew Sabadell at the same time, Barcelona ATC mistook that second aircraft's radar echo for that of the Dan-Air Comet and so the air traffic controller handling the Dan-Air flight did not notice the navigational error by the Comet's crew. However, there is no proof that another aircraft overflew the Sabadell beacon at that time. The testimony of the air traffic controller remains implausible.

The explosion following the impact completely destroyed the aircraft and instantly killed everyone on board. After an extensive all-night search over a wide area, rescue teams reached the crash site the following day. The Spanish authorities insisted on an immediate burial of the dead bodies for public health reasons.

Aircraft
The aircraft, operated by Dan Air Services Ltd, was a de Havilland DH 106 Comet series 4 (registration: G-APDN, construction/manufacturer's serial number: 6415) that had its first flight in 1959. Dan-Air acquired the aircraft from British Overseas Airways Corporation – its original operator – in 1969. At the time of the accident, it had flown 25,786 hours.

Cause
The investigation identified a combination of erroneous information, in relation to en-route reporting points and the existence of a radar echo from another aircraft that overflew the Sabadell NDB at the same time as the Dan-Air crew mistakenly reported passing it, as the accident's probable cause. This combination resulted in an involuntary error on the part of both ATC and aircraft that could not be corrected by the time the air traffic controller realised that his instructions to the aircraft's crew were given in response to a mutual misunderstanding, which resulted from a navigational error on the crew's part that had gone unnoticed.

References

External links

 Aviation Safety Network
 "Faulty Navigation" blamed" Flight International, 3 September 1970, p. 332
 

Aviation accidents and incidents in 1970
Aviation accidents and incidents in Spain
Airliner accidents and incidents involving controlled flight into terrain
Accidents and incidents involving the de Havilland Comet
Dan-Air accidents and incidents
1970 in Spain
July 1970 events in Europe
1970 disasters in Spain